The 1957–58 DDR-Oberliga season was the tenth season of the DDR-Oberliga, the top level of ice hockey in East Germany. Six teams participated in the league, and SG Dynamo Weißwasser won the championship.

Regular season

References

External links
East German results 1949-1970

East
DDR-Oberliga (ice hockey) seasons
1957 in East German sport
1958 in East German sport
Ger